Estadio Dr. Manuel de Mello was a multi-use stadium in Barreiro, Portugal.  It was used mostly for football matches and was the home stadium of FC Barreirense. The stadium was able to hold 10,500 people and was built in 1952. It is also used by Jehovah's witnesses as a venue for their district conventions

Dr. Manuel de Mello
Buildings and structures in Setúbal District
Sports venues completed in 1952